Physalaemus cicada is a species of frog in the family Leptodactylidae.
It is endemic to Brazil.
Its natural habitats are dry savanna, moist savanna, and intermittent freshwater marshes.
It is threatened by habitat loss.

References

cicada
Endemic fauna of Brazil
Taxonomy articles created by Polbot
Amphibians described in 1966